The Huancavelica Province is one of seven provinces located in the Huancavelica Region of Peru. The capital of this province is the city of Huancavelica.

Boundaries
North: Tayacaja Province
East: Acobamba Province, Churcampa Province and Angaraes Province
South: Huaytará Province and Castrovirreyna Province
West: Lima Region and Junín Region

Geography 
There are a couple of large lakes in the province like Anqasqucha, Astuqucha, Chiliqucha, Chunchuqucha, Kanllaqucha, Milluqucha, Papaqucha, Qiwllaqucha, Tipiqucha, Warmiqucha and Ñawinqucha some of which belong to the largest lakes of Peru.

The Chunta mountain range traverses the province. Some of the highest peaks of the province are  listed below:

Political division
The province is divided into nineteen districts, which are:
 Acobambilla (Acobambilla)
 Acoria (Acoria)
 Ascensión (Ascención)
 Conayca (Conayca)
 Cuenca (Cuenca)
 Huachocolpa (Huachocolpa)
 Huancavelica (Huancavelica)
 Huando (Huando)
 Huayllahuara (Huayllahuara)
 Izcuchaca (Izcuchaca)
 Laria (Laria)
 Manta (Manta)
 Mariscal Cáceres (Mariscal Cáceres)
 Moya (Moya)
 Nuevo Occoro (Occoro)
 Palca (Palca)
 Pilchaca (Pilchaca)
 Vilca (Vilca)
 Yauli (Yauli)

Ethnic groups 
The people in the province are mainly Indigenous citizens of Quechua descent. Quechua is the language which the majority of the population (55.06%) learnt to speak in childhood, 44.70% of the residents started speaking using the Spanish language (2007 Peru Census).

See also 
 Administrative divisions of Peru
 Llaqta Qulluy (Acoria)
 Llaqta Qulluy (Conayca)
 Llaqta Qulluy (Vilca)
 Uchkus Inkañan

Sources 

Provinces of the Huancavelica Region